Dejan Gerić (born 3 May 1988, in Kranj) is a retired Slovenian football midfielder.

He spent most of his career playing for Interblock and has five international caps for Slovenia U21. He has won the Slovenian Cup twice (2007–08 and 2008–09) and the Slovenian Supercup twice, in 2008 and 2011. Before the start of the 2011–12 season, he left Interblock and signed for Domžale on a free transfer. In the 2012–13 winter transfer window he signed a year and a half long contract with Olimpija. During the winter break of the 2013–14 season he signed with Serbian club FK Radnik Surdulica.

Honours

Club
Interblock
 Slovenian Cup: 2007–08, 2008–09
 Slovenian Supercup: 2008

Domžale
 Slovenian Supercup: 2011

References

External links

Player profile at PrvaLiga 

1988 births
Living people
Sportspeople from Kranj
Slovenian footballers
Association football midfielders
NK Domžale players
NK IB 1975 Ljubljana players
AEK Larnaca FC players
NK Olimpija Ljubljana (2005) players
Slovenian PrvaLiga players
Cypriot Second Division players
Slovenian expatriate footballers
Slovenian expatriate sportspeople in Cyprus
Expatriate footballers in Cyprus
Slovenian expatriate sportspeople in Serbia
Expatriate footballers in Serbia
Serbian First League players
FK Radnik Surdulica players
NK Triglav Kranj players
Slovenia youth international footballers
Slovenia under-21 international footballers